The one-colored becard (Pachyramphus homochrous) is a species of bird in the family Tityridae. It has traditionally been placed in Cotingidae or Tyrannidae, but evidence strongly suggest it is better placed in Tityridae, where it is now placed by the South American Classification Committee.

Description 
The one-colored becard is sexually dimorphic. The male is black with a grey underside while the female is cinnamon with a buff underside.

Distribution and habitat
It is found in Colombia, Ecuador, Panama, Peru, and Venezuela. Its natural habitats are subtropical or tropical dry forest, subtropical or tropical moist lowland forest, and heavily degraded former forest.

References

Pachyramphus
Birds described in 1859
Taxa named by Philip Sclater
Birds of Colombia
Birds of Ecuador
Taxonomy articles created by Polbot